The 2006 LEN Women's Champions' Cup was the 19th edition of the premier international competition for European women's water polo clubs, organized by LEN. Fourteen national champions took part in the competition, which took place from 9 February to 30 April 2006.

Orizzonte Catania won its third title in a row, becoming the first club to achieve this, and an overall seventh by overcoming runner-up Kinef Kirishi, bronze Dunaújvárosi Főiskola and OC Vouliagmeni in the final stage.

Qualification round

Group A

Group B

Semifinals Round

Group A

Group B

Final round

References

LEN Euro League Women seasons
Women, Euro League
LEN
2006 in European sport